Ararat Chronicle and Willaura and Lake Bolac Districts Recorder was a newspaper published in Ararat, Victoria, Australia.

History 
The newspaper was first published on 23 January 1909 and ceased publication .

Digitisation 
Issues from 1914 to 1918 have been digitised and are available on Trove.

References

External links 
 

Defunct newspapers published in Victoria (Australia)
Ararat, Victoria